Bhausaheb Patil Chikatgaonkar is an Indian politician and District President of the Nationalist Congress Party. Bhausaheb Patil Chikatgaonkar  won the Vaijapur constituency of Maharashtra  in the Assembly Election 2014.
Birth Date : 4-4-1961

Terms in office
Bhausaheb Patil Chikatgaonkar is a first term member in the Maharashtra Legislative Assembly MLA.

References

Living people
Maharashtra MLAs 2014–2019
Nationalist Congress Party politicians from Maharashtra
Marathi politicians
Year of birth missing (living people)